Ezra Joseph Warner III (July 4, 1910 – May 30, 1974) was a historian of the American Civil War. He was born in Lake Forest, Illinois and lived in La Jolla, California where he worked as an investment counselor. He was the son of Ezra J. Warner, Jr. and grandson of Ezra J Warner, who were wholesale grocery business executives in Chicago, Illinois. His father, Ezra J. Warner, Jr., was president & treasurer of wholesale grocery business Sprague, Warner & Company and vice president of the Chicago Orchestral Association. His mother was the former Marion Hall. He is buried in Lake Forest Cemetery in Lake Forest. His great uncle was Union General James M. Warner.

Ezra J. Warner III is well known for his work in Civil War biography. His works included:

 
 .
 .

Notes

1910 births
1974 deaths
20th-century American historians
American male non-fiction writers
Historians of the American Civil War
American military historians
Burials at Lake Forest Cemetery
20th-century American male writers